The Wendy Williams Experience is an American reality television series that aired on VH1 from October 20, 2006, to December 9, 2006. It chronicles Wendy Williams as she hosts her radio show on (107.5 WBLS) with Charlamagne as her co-host. On the radio show, Williams spoke about gossip, fashion, celebrity news, and gave advice to callers. She also interviewed celebrities, and is noted for asking outrageous questions.

Episodes

References

External links
 

2000s American reality television series
2006 American television series debuts
2006 American television series endings
English-language television shows
African-American reality television series
VH1 original programming